Mishan-e Sofla or Mishan Sofla may refer to:
 Mishan-e Sofla, Chaharmahal and Bakhtiari
 Mishan-e Sofla, Fars